The 12th New Zealand Parliament was a term of the New Zealand Parliament. It was elected at the 1893 general election in November and December of that year.

1893 general election

In the 1892 electoral redistribution, population shift to the North Island required the transfer of one seat from the South Island to the north. The resulting ripple effect saw every electorate established in 1890 have its boundaries altered, and 14 new electorates were established.

The 1893 general election was held on Tuesday, 28 November in the general electorates and on Wednesday, 20 December in the Māori electorates, respectively. A total of 74 MPs were elected; 30 represented North Island electorates, 40 represented South Island electorates, and the remaining four represented Māori electorates.  302,997 voters were enrolled and the official turnout at the election was 75.3%.

Sessions
The 12th Parliament sat for three sessions, and was prorogued on 14 November 1896.

Overview of seats

Ministries
The Liberal Government of New Zealand had taken office on 24 January 1891. John Ballance, who had been leading the Ballance Ministry, had died on 27 April 1893 and had been succeeded by the Seddon Ministry under Richard Seddon.  The Seddon Ministry remained in power for the whole term of this Parliament and held power until Seddon's death on 10 June 1906.

Initial composition of the 12th Parliament
74 seats were created across 66 electorates. 62 electorates returned a single member and four electoral districts had three representatives each. The Liberal party was the only established party structure at the time, many independent conservative MPs coalesced as a semi-formal Opposition under the leadership of William Russell.

By-elections during 12th Parliament
There were a number of changes during the term of the 12th Parliament.

Notes

References

External links
Roll of Members of the House of Representatives in 1894

12